Taylor Edgar, stand-up comic and musician, was born on July 12, 1987, in Sarasota, Florida. His parents lived in neighboring Bradenton, Florida, where at an early age he played tennis at the Nick Bollettieri Tennis Academy. At age nine, he moved with his mother and stepfather to Warrenton, Virginia, in Fauquier County, Once enrolled in college at George Mason University in Fairfax, Virginia, he began his stand-up comedy career.

Career

Taylor began his Stand-up comedy career doing open mics in the Washington, D.C., area in May, 2006 at clubs such as The Comedy Spot in Ballston, Virginia, and Wiseacre's in Tyson's Corner. In February 2007, he entered the preliminary round of the District's Funniest College Student Competition (run by the DC Improv) at GMU. After tying for first place, he moved on to the final round at the Improv and on April 11, 2007 he won first place in the final and was named the funniest college student in DC. He has since performed with local DC stars such as Ryan Conner, Tim Miller, and Danny Rouhier, as well as national headliners such as Brad Trackman, Joe Recca, Jon Reep, and Frank Caliendo.  He has also had the opportunity to appear on stage as a guest with local rock band and longtime friends, The Sugar Plum Fairies

He continues to perform locally in DC and attends George Mason University full-time. He is majoring in anthropology.

External links
 Official website
 Taylor at the Comedy Spot
 Taylor at the DC Improv

1987 births
Living people
George Mason University alumni
People from Sarasota, Florida
People from Warrenton, Virginia
American male comedians
21st-century American comedians